Hypotrix hueco is a moth of the family Noctuidae first described by William Barnes in 1904. It is known only from south-eastern Arizona in the United States.

The length of the forewings is 14–16 mm. Adults are on wing from mid-June to mid-August.

External links
A revision of the genus Hypotrix Guenée in North America with descriptions of four new species and a new genus (Lepidoptera, Noctuidae, Noctuinae, Eriopygini)

Hypotrix
Moths described in 1904